The men's long jump at the 2009 World Championships in Athletics was held at the Olympic Stadium on 20 and 22 August. The season had seen a number of athletes performing to a high level before the championships, with reigning World and Olympic champion Irving Saladino. The other athlete to jump that distance was Dwight Phillips, who is the world leader with a jump of 8.74 meters. Dwight Phillips took bronze in 2007 and is looking for his first win over Irving Saladino at an international level. Italy's Andrew Howe, the 2007 world silver medalist, withdrew from the Championships. Other expected to medal content are Olympic silver medalist Godfrey Khotso Mokoena and Olympic Bronze Medalist Ibrahim Camejo.

Medalists

Records

Prior to the competition, the following records were as follows.

No new records was set during this competition.

Qualification standards

Schedule

Results

Qualification
Qualification: Qualifying Performance 8.15 (Q) or at least 12 best performers (q) advance to the final.

Key:  NR = National record, NM = No mark, Q = qualification by place in heat, q = qualification by overall place, SB = Seasonal best

Final

Key:  NM = No mark

References
Long jump qualification from IAAF. IAAF. Retrieved on 2009-08-26.
Long jump final results from IAAF. IAAF. Retrieved on 2009-08-26.

Long jump
Long jump at the World Athletics Championships